Clinton Charles Sundberg (December 7, 1903 (some sources say 1906) – December 14, 1987)  was an American character actor in film and stage.

Early years
Sundberg was born in Appleton, Minnesota. He graduated from Hamline University in St. Paul, Minnesota, where he was active in drama, president of his fraternity, and captain of the tennis team.

Career
Sundberg left teaching English literature for acting, appearing in plays in stock theater in New England. He appeared in a number of Broadway plays, debuting in Nine Pine Street (1933). His most notable roles were Mr. Kraler in the original 1957 production of The Diary of Anne Frank and Mortimer Brewster (as a replacement) in the 1944 Arsenic and Old Lace.

He became a contract player at Metro-Goldwyn-Mayer where he appeared in numerous supporting roles in films of the late 1940s and  early 1950s. He played Mike, the bartender who listens to Judy Garland's character's troubles in Easter Parade. In the 1949 film In the Good Old Summertime, which also starred Garland and Van Johnson, he played a friendly co-worker and confidante of Johnson's character. He also played the hotel owner who hired Annie Oakley to enter the shooting contest against Frank Butler in Annie Get Your Gun. He later made several television appearances, including two episodes of Perry Mason: "The Case of the Drowsy Mosquito" in 1963 and "The Case of the Scarlet Scandal" in 1966. He also appeared in several television commercials.

In 1957, Sundberg appeared in a TV episode of Have Gun - Will Travel, The Englishman.

In 1962, Sundberg was cast in the lead guest-starring role of Luther Boardman, a naive but troublesome newspaper publisher who comes to Laramie, Wyoming, to capture the story of "real West" gunfighters in "The Man Behind the News", one of the last episodes of the ABC/Warner Brothers western series, Lawman, which starred John Russell as Marshal Dan Troop. Hal Baylor appears in the episode as gunfighter Mort Peters, whom Boardman (Sundberg) goads into a shootout with Troop.

Partial filmography

Undercurrent (1946) – Mr. Warmsley
Love Laughs at Andy Hardy (1946) – Haberdashery Clerk
The Mighty McGurk (1947) – Flexter
Undercover Maisie (1947) – Guy Canford
Living in a Big Way (1947) – Everett Hanover Smythe
The Hucksters (1947) – Michael Michaelson
Song of the Thin Man (1947) – Mr. Purdy – Hotel Vesta Desk Clerk (uncredited)
Song of Love (1947) – Dr. Richarz (uncredited)
Desire Me (1947) – Salesman (scenes deleted)
Good News (1947) – Prof. Burton Kennyon
The Bride Goes Wild (1948) – Dentist (uncredited)
Easter Parade (1948) – Mike the Bartender
A Date with Judy (1948) – Jameson
Mr. Peabody and the Mermaid (1948) – Mike Fitzgerald
Good Sam (1948) – Nelson
The Kissing Bandit (1948) – Colonel Gomez
Words and Music (1948) – Shoe Clerk
Command Decision (1948) – Major Homer V. Prescott
Big Jack (1949) – C. Petronius Smith
The Stratton Story (1949) – Man on Radio Baking Pie (voice, uncredited)
The Barkleys of Broadway (1949) – Bert Felsher
In the Good Old Summertime (1949) – Rudy Hansen
Key to the City (1950) – Clerk
Father Is a Bachelor (1950) – Plato Cassin
Annie Get Your Gun (1950) – Foster Wilson
Duchess of Idaho (1950) – Matson
The Toast of New Orleans (1950) – Oscar
Two Weeks with Love (1950) – Mr. Finlay
Mrs. O'Malley and Mr. Malone (1950) – Donald – Steve's Bookie
On the Riviera (1951) – Antoine
The Fat Man (1951) – Bill Norton
As Young as You Feel (1951) – Frank Erickson
Take Care of My Little Girl (1951) – Fraternity Dance Guest (uncredited)
The Belle of New York (1952) – Gilford Spivak
The Girl Next Door (1953) – Samuels the butler
Sweethearts on Parade (1953) – Dr. Harold Wayne
The Caddy (1953) – Charles – the Butler
Main Street to Broadway (1953) – The Father – Mr. Harry Craig
The Birds and the Bees (1956) – Purser
Bachelor in Paradise (1961) – Rodney Jones
The Wonderful World of the Brothers Grimm (1962) – The Prime Minister ('The Dancing Princess') / Hans ('The Singing Bone') (singing voice)
How the West Was Won (1962) – Hylan Seabury (uncredited)
Hotel (1967) – Lawrence Morgan
A Snow White Christmas (1980) – Thinker (voice)
The Princess and the Cobbler (1993) – Dying Soldier (voice) (final film role)

References

External links

1900s births
1987 deaths
20th-century American male actors
American male film actors
American male stage actors
Male actors from Minnesota
Metro-Goldwyn-Mayer contract players
People from Appleton, Minnesota